Kakkonen or II divisioona is the third level in the league system of Finnish football and comprises 36 Finnish football teams. The II divisioona was introduced in 1973 and in the mid-1990s became known as the Kakkonen (Finnish for 'Number Two'). Sakari Tukiainen finished the season 2014 as the top goal scorer and setting a new league record with 40 goals for the Kakkonen. Petter Meyer finished the 2015 as the top goal scorer for GrIFK with 23 goals.

League structure
For the 2012 season the format of the Kakkonen has been changed with the league divided in 4 groups of 10 teams, each representing a geographical area. Every club plays each of the others in the same group three times. Clubs gain three points for a win, one for a draw, and none for a loss. The group winners may win promotion to Ykkönen while two bottom clubs of each group and weakest 8th ranked club will be relegated to Kolmonen.

For the 2016 season the format of the Kakkonen has been changed with the league divided into 3 groups of 12 teams. Each club plays the others in its group twice. The group winners and the best second place team have a chance of winning one of two promotion places to Ykkönen after a four team playoff. The bottom three teams in each group 10, 11 and 12 will be relegated to Kolmonen.

Administration

Sections and teams 2022

Kakkonen Group A

Kakkonen Group B

Kakkonen Group C

All details taken from Finnish FA website.

Seasons - League Tables

Group Winners

1970–1972 II divisioona, Tier 2

1973–1993 II divisioona, Tier 3

1994- Kakkonen, Tier 3

Footnotes

External links
Finnish FA (Suomen Palloliitto - Kakkonen 2013)
Kakkonen - Finnish Wikipedia

 
3
Fin
Professional sports leagues in Finland